Scrobipalpa lutea is a moth of the family Gelechiidae. It is found in Russia (the southern Ural) and Turkey.

References

Moths described in 1977
Taxa named by Dalibor Povolný
Scrobipalpa